Return to Annihilation is an album from the drone rock band Locrian. It was released on June 25, 2013 through Relapse Records.

Background 

Return to Annihilation was announced on April 25, 2013 through a press releases which described the release as the band's “Relapse Records” full-length debut.

The group was inspired by the “band’s love for prog-rock progenitors Genesis, Yes & King Crimson.”

Reception 

The album generally received favorable responses from critics and fans alike. Pitchfork Media gave the album a positive review, rating the album at 8 out of 10 and praising the album as being the group's “most provocative and engaging album to date.” Consequence of Sound gave the album a C+ and noted that the band had added variety to their songwriting on the album, incorporating aspects of black metal and blissful shoe gaze. They added that the group are transposing the black metal template onto other genres along with their "contemporaries Deafheaven and Sunn O)))."

The album currently has a score of 80 on Metacritic, indicating “generally favorable reviews.”

Spin magazine included the release in their list of the "Best 20 Metal Albums of 2013" and ranked the album at number four.

Track listing

References

External links 
 

2013 albums
Locrian (band) albums
Relapse Records albums